Mulatupo is a town in the Kuna Yala province of Panama. The town lies in the island of Muladub and shares it with town of Sasardi Muladub.

Transportation 
The village is served by the Mulatupo Airport .

Sources 
World Gazetteer: Panama – World-Gazetteer.com

Populated places in Guna Yala